Nathaniel Manley Hayward (January 19, 1808 – July 18, 1865) was a US businessman and inventor best known for selling a patent to Charles Goodyear that Goodyear later used to develop the process of vulcanization.

Biography 
Nathaniel Hayward was born in Easton, Massachusetts on January 19, 1808.

Hayward met Goodyear in 1837 and shared with him the discovery he had made, almost accidentally, while working at a rubber factory in Roxbury, Connecticut. He bought some mills in Stoneham, Massachusetts, from Elisha S. Converse, which later became a small settlement called Haywardville.

He died in Colchester, Connecticut on July 18, 1865.

Hayward's former home in Colchester has been listed on the National Register of Historic Places since 1972.

References 

1808 births
1865 deaths
19th-century American inventors
People from Colchester, Connecticut
American company founders
19th-century American businesspeople